The slash is the oblique slanting line punctuation mark . Also known as a stroke, a solidus or several other historical or technical names including oblique and virgule. Once used to mark periods and commas, the slash is now used to represent division and fractions,  exclusive 'or' and inclusive 'or', and as a date separator. 

A slash in the reverse direction  is known as a backslash.

History
Slashes may be found in early writing as a variant form of dashes, vertical strokes, etc. The present use of a slash distinguished from such other marks derives from the medieval European virgule (which was used as a period, scratch comma, and caesura mark. (The first sense was eventually lost to the low dot and the other two developed separately into the comma  and caesura mark ) Its use as a comma became especially widespread in France, where it was also used to mark the continuation of a word onto the next line of a page, a sense later taken on by the hyphen . The Fraktur script used throughout Central Europe in the early modern period used a single slash as a scratch comma and a double slash  as a dash. The double slash developed into the double oblique hyphen  and double hyphen  or  before being usually simplified into various single dashes.

In the 18th century, the mark was generally known in English as the "oblique". The variant "oblique stroke" was increasingly shortened to "stroke", which became the common British name for the character, although printers and publishing professionals often instead referred to it as an "oblique". In the 19th and early 20th century, it was also widely known as the "shilling mark" or "solidus", from its use as a notation or abbreviation for the shilling. The name "slash" is a recent development, not appearing in Webster's Dictionary until the Third Edition (1961) but has gained wide currency through its use in computing, a context where it is sometimes used in British English in preference to "stroke". Clarifying terms such as "forward slash" have been coined owing to widespread use of Microsoft's DOS and Windows operating systems, which use the backslash extensively.

Usage

Disjunction and conjunction

Connecting alternatives

The slash is commonly used in many languages as a shorter substitute for the conjunction "or", typically with the sense of exclusive or (e.g., Y/N permits yes or no but not both). Its use in this sense is somewhat informal, although it is used in philology to note variants (e.g., virgula/) and etymologies (e.g., 

Such slashes may be used to avoid taking a position in naming disputes. One example is the Syriac naming dispute, which prompted the US and Swedish censuses to use the respective official designations "Assyrian/Chaldean/Syriac" and "Assyrier/Syrianer" for the ethnic group.

In particular, since the late 20th century, the slash is used to permit more gender-neutral language in place of the traditional masculine or plural gender neutrals. In the case of English, this is usually restricted to degendered pronouns such as "he/she" or "s/he". Most other Indo-European languages include more far-reaching use of grammatical gender. In these, the separate gendered desinences (grammatical suffices) of the words may be given divided by slashes or set off with parentheses. Less commonly, the æ ligature or at sign  is used instead: . This does not always work smoothly, however: problems arise in the case of words like  ("doctor") where the explicitly female form  is umlauted and words like  ("Chinese person") where the explicitly female form  loses the terminal -e.

Connecting non-contrasting items
The slash is also used as a shorter substitute for the conjunction "and" or inclusive or (i.e., A or B or both), typically in situations where it fills the role of a hyphen or en dash. For example, the "Hemingway/Faulkner generation" might be used to discuss the era of the Lost Generation inclusive of the people around and affected by both Hemingway and Faulkner. This use is sometimes proscribed, as by New Hart's Rules, the style guide for the Oxford University Press.

Presenting routes
The slash, as a form of inclusive or, is also used to punctuate the stages of a route (e.g., Shanghai/Nanjing/Wuhan/Chongqing as stops on a tour of the Yangtze).

Introducing topic shifts 
The word "slash" is also developing as a way to introduce topic shifts or follow-up statements. "Slash" can introduce a follow up statement, such as, "I really love that hot dog place on Liberty Street. Slash can we go there tomorrow?" It can also indicate a shift to an unrelated topic, as in "JUST SAW ALEX! Slash I just chubbed on oatmeal raisin cookies at north quad and i miss you." The new usage of "slash" appears most frequently in spoken conversation, though it can also appear in writing.

In speech
Sometimes the word "slash" is used in speech as a conjunction to represent the written role of the character (as if a written slash were being read aloud from text), e.g. "bee slash mosquito protection" for a beekeeper's net hood, and "There's a little bit of nectar slash honey over here, but really it's not a lot." (said by a beekeeper examining in a beehive), and "Gastornis slash Diatryma" for two supposed genera of prehistoric birds which are now thought to be one genus.

Mathematics

Fractions 
The fraction slash  is used between two numbers to indicate a fraction or ratio. Such formatting developed as a way to write the horizontal fraction bar on a single line of text. It is first attested in England and Mexico in the 18th century. This notation is known as an online, solidus, or shilling fraction. Nowadays fractions, unlike inline division, are often given using smaller numbers, superscript, and subscript (e.g., 23⁄43). This notation is responsible for the current form of the percent , permille , and permyriad  signs, developed from the horizontal form  which represented an early modern corruption of an Italian abbreviation of per cento.
Many fonts draw the fraction slash (and the division slash) less vertical than the slash. The separate encoding is also intended to permit automatic formatting of the preceding and succeeding digits by glyph substitution with numerator and denominator glyphs (e.g., display of "1, fraction slash, 2" as "½"), though this is not yet supported in many environments or fonts. Because of this lack of support, some authors still use Unicode subscripts and superscripts to compose fractions, and many fonts design these characters for this purpose. In addition, all of the multiples less than 1 of  1⁄n for 2 ≤ n ≤ 6 and n = 8 (e.g. 2⁄3 and 5⁄8), as well as 1⁄7, 1⁄9, and 1⁄10,  are in the Unicode Number Forms or Latin-1 Supplement block as precomposed characters.

This notation can also be used when the concept of fractions is extended from numbers to arbitrary rings by the method of localization of a ring.

Division  
The division slash , equivalent to the division sign , may be used between two numbers to indicate division. This use developed from the fraction slash in the late 18th or early 19th century. The formatting was advocated by De Morgan in the mid-19th century.

Quotient of set 
A quotient of a set is informally a new set obtained by identifying some elements of the original set. This is denoted as a fraction  (sometimes even as a built fraction), where the numerator  is the original set (often equipped with some algebraic structure). What is appropriate as denominator depends on the context.

In group theory, the slash is used to mark quotient groups. Since many algebraic structures (rings, vector spaces, etc.) in particular are groups, the same style of quotients extend also to these, although the denominator may need to satisfy additional closure properties for the quotient to preserve the full algebraic structure of the original (e.g. for the quotient of a ring to be a ring, the denominator must be an ideal).

When the original set is the set of integers , the denominator may alternatively be just an integer: .

Combining slash 
Slashes may also be used as a combining character in mathematical formulae. The most important use of this is that combining a slash with a relation negates it, producing e.g.

The Feynman slash notation is an unrelated use of combining slashes, mostly seen in quantum field theory. This kind of combining slash takes a vector base symbol and converts it to a matrix quantity. Technically this notation is a shorthand for contracting the vector with the Dirac gamma matrices, so ; what one gains is not only a more compact formula, but also not having to allocate a letter as the contracted index.

Computing
The slash, sometimes distinguished as "forward slash", is used in computing in a number of ways, primarily as a separator among levels in a given hierarchy, for example in the path of a filesystem.

File paths
The slash is used as the path component separator in many computer operating systems (e.g., Unix's ). In Unix and Unix-like systems, such as macOS and Linux, the slash is also used for the volume root directory (e.g., the initial slash in ). Confusion of the slash with the backslash  largely arises from the use of the latter as the path component separator in the widely used MS-DOS and Microsoft Windows systems.

Networking
The slash is used in a similar fashion in internet URLs (e.g.). Often this portion of such URLs corresponds with files on a Unix server with the same name, and this is where this convention for internet URLs comes from.

The slash in an IP address (e.g.) indicates the prefix size in CIDR notation. The number of addresses of a subnet may be calculated as 2address size − prefix size, in which the address size is 128 for IPv6 and 32 for IPv4. For example, in IPv4, the prefix size /29 gives: 232–29 = 23 = 8 addresses.

Programming
The slash is used as a division operator in most programming languages while APL uses it for reduction (fold) and compression (filter). The double slash is used by Rexx as a modulo operator, and Python (starting in version 2.2) uses a double slash for division which rounds (using floor) to an integer.  In Raku the double slash is used as a "defined-or" alternative to ||. A dot and slash  is used in MATLAB and GNU Octave to indicate an element-by-element division of matrices.

A double slash  is also used by C99, C++, C#, PHP, Java, Swift, and JavaScript to start a single line comment.

In SGML and derived languages such as HTML and XML, a slash is used in closing tags. For example, in HTML,  begins a section of bold text and  closes it. In XHTML, slashes are also necessary for "self-closing" elements such as the newline command  where HTML has simply .

In a style originating in the Digital Equipment Corporation line of operating systems (OS/8, RT-11, TOPS-10, et cetera), Windows, DOS, some CP/M programs, OpenVMS, and OS/2 all use the slash to indicate command-line options. For example, the command  is understood as using the command dir ("directory") with the "wide" option. Notice that no space is required between the command and the switch; this was the reason for the choice to use backslashes as the path separator since one would otherwise be unable to run a program in a different directory.

Slashes are used as the standard delimiters for regular expressions, although other characters can be used instead.

IBM JCL uses a double slash to start each line in a batch job stream except for /* and /&.

Programs
IRC and many in-game chat clients use the slash to mark commands, such as joining and leaving a chat room or sending private messages. In Minecrafts chat function, the slash is used for executing console and plugin commands. In Second Lifes chat function, the slash is used to select the "communications channel", allowing users to direct commands to virtual objects "listening" on different channels. For example, if a virtual house's lights were set to use channel 42, the command "/42 on" would turn them on. In Discord, Slash commands are used to send special messages and execute commands, like sending a shrug (¯\_(ツ)_/¯) or a table flip ((╯°□°)╯︵ ┻━┻), or changing your nickname using "/nick". Now, slash commands can also be used to use Discord bots. 

The Gedcom standard for exchanging computerized genealogical data uses slashes to delimit surnames. Example: Bill /Smith/ Jr. Slashes around surnames are also used in Personal Ancestral File.

Currency

The slash (as the "shilling mark" or "solidus") was an abbreviation for the shilling, a former coin of the United Kingdom and its former colonies. Before the decimalisation of currency in Britain, its currency abbreviations (collectively £sd) represented their Latin names, derived from a medieval French modification of the late Roman libra, solidus, and denarius. Thus, one penny less than two pounds was written  During the period when English orthography included the long s, the ſ came to be written as a single slash. The s. and the d. might therefore be omitted, and "2/6" meant "two shillings and sixpence". Amounts in full pounds, shillings and pence could be written in many different ways, for example: £1 9s 6d, £1.9.6, £1-9-6, and even £1/9/6d (with a slash used also to separate pounds and shillings).  The same style was also used under the British Raj and early independent India for the predecimalization rupee/anna/pie system.

In five East African countries (Kenya, Tanzania, Uganda, Somalia, and the de facto country of Somaliland), where the national currencies are denominated in shillings, the decimal separator is a slash mark (e.g.). Where the minor unit is zero, an equals sign is used (e.g., 5/=).

Dates 
Slashes are a common calendar date separator used across many countries and by some standards such as the Common Log Format used by web servers. Depending on context, it may be in the form Day/Month/Year, Month/Day/Year, or Year/Month/Day. If only two elements are present, they typically denote a day and month in some order. For example, 9/11 is a common American way of writing the date 11 September; Britons write this as 11/9. Owing to the ambiguity across cultures, the practice of using only two elements to denote a date is sometimes proscribed.

Because of the world's many varying conventional date and time formats, ISO 8601 advocates the use of a Year-Month-Day system separated by hyphens (e.g., Victory in Europe Day occurred on 1945-05-08). In the ISO 8601 system, slashes represent date ranges: "1939/1945" represents what is more commonly written as  The autumn term of a northern-hemisphere school year might be marked "2010-09-01/12-22".

In English, a range marked by a slash often has a separate meaning from one marked by a dash or hyphen. "24/25 December" would mark the time shared by both days (i.e., the night from Christmas Eve to Christmas morning) rather than the time made up by both days together, which would be written "24–25 December". Similarly, a historical reference to "1066/67" might imply an event occurred during the winter of late 1066 and early 1067, whereas a reference to 1066–67 would cover the entirety of both years. The usage was particularly common in British English during World War II, where such slash dates were used for night-bombing air raids. It is also used by some police forces in the United States.

Numbering
The slash is used in numbering to note totals. For example, "page 17/35" indicates that the relevant passage is on the 17th page of a 35-page document. Similarly, the marking "#333/500" on a product indicates it is the 333rd out of 500 identical products or out of a batch of 500 such products. For scores on schoolwork, in games, &c., "85/100" indicates 85 points were attained out of a possible 100.

Slashes are also sometimes used to mark ranges in numbers that already include hyphens or dashes. One example is the ISO treatment of dating. Another is the US Air Force's treatment of aircraft serial numbers, which are normally written to note the fiscal year and aircraft number. For example, "85-1000" notes the thousandth aircraft ordered in fiscal year 1985. To indicate the next fifty subsequent aircraft, a slash is used in place of a hyphen or dash: "85-1001/1050".

Linguistic transcription

A pair of slashes (as "slants") are used in the transcription of speech to enclose pronunciations (i.e., phonetic transcriptions). For example, the IPA transcription of the English pronunciation of "solidus" is written . Properly, slashes mark broad or phonemic transcriptions, whereas narrow, allophonic transcriptions are enclosed by square brackets. For example, the word "little" may be broadly rendered as  but a careful transcription of the velarization of the second L would be written .

In sociolinguistics, a double or triple slash may also be used in the transcription of a traditional sociolinguistic interview or in other type of linguistic elicitation to represent simultaneous speech, interruptions, and certain types of speech disfluencies.

Single and double slashes are often used as typographic substitutes for the click letters ǀ, ǁ.

Poetry  
The slash is used in various scansion notations for representing the metrical pattern of a line of verse, typically to indicate a stressed syllable.

Line breaks
The slash (as a "virgule") offset by spaces to either side is used to mark line breaks when transcribing text from a multi-line format into a single-line one. It is particularly common in quoting poetry, song lyrics, and dramatic scripts, formats where omitting the line breaks risks losing meaningful context. For example, when quoting Hamlet's soliloquy
To be, or not to be, that is the question:
Whether 'tis Nobler in the mind to suffer
The Slings and Arrows of outrageous Fortune,
Or to take Arms against a Sea of troubles,
And by opposing end them...
into a prose paragraph, it is standard to mark the line breaks as "To be, or not to be, that is the  Whether 'tis nobler in the mind to  The slings and arrows of outrageous  Or to take arms against a sea of  And by opposing end them..." Less often, virgules are used in marking paragraph breaks when quoting a prose passage. Some style guides, such as Hart's, prefer to use a pipe  in place of the slash to mark these line and paragraph breaks. 

The virgule may be thinner than a standard slash when typeset. In computing contexts, it may be necessary to use a non-breaking space before the virgule to prevent it from being widowed on the next line.

Abbreviation  
The slash has become standard in several abbreviations. Generally, it is used to mark two-letter initialisms such as A/C (short for "air conditioner"), w/o ("without"), b/w ("black and white" or, less often, "between"), w/e ("whatever" or, less often, "weekend" or "week ending"), i/o ("input/output"), r/w ("read/write"), and n/a ("not applicable"). Other initialisms employing the slash include w/ ("with") and w/r/t ("with regard to"). Such slashed abbreviations are somewhat more common in British English and were more common around the Second World War (as with "S/E" to mean "single-engined"). The abbreviation 24/7 (denoting 24 hours a day, 7 days a week) describes a business that is always open or unceasing activity.

The slash in derived units such as m/s (meters per second) is not an abbreviation slash, but a straight division. It is however in that position read as 'per' rather than e.g. 'over', which can be seen as analogous to units whose symbols are pure abbreviations such as mph (miles per hour), although in abbreviations 'per' is 'p' or dropped entirely (psi, pounds per square inch) rather than a slash.

In the US government, the names of offices within various departments are abbreviated using slashes, starting with the larger office and following with its subdivisions. For example, the Federal Aviation Administration's Office of Commercial Space Transportation is formally abbreviated FAA/AST.

Proofreading
The slash or vertical bar (as a "separatrix") is used in proofreading to mark the end of margin notes or to separate margin notes from one another. The slash is also sometimes used in various proofreading initialisms, such as l/c and u/c for changes to lower and upper case, respectively.

Fiction
The slash is used in fan fiction to mark the romantic pairing a piece will focus upon (e.g., a K/S denoted a Star Trek story would focus on a sexual relationship between Kirk and Spock), a usage which developed in the 1970s from the earlier friendship pairings marked by ampersands (e.g., K&S). The genre as a whole is now known as slash fiction. Because it is more generally associated with homosexual male relationships, lesbian slash fiction is sometimes distinguished as femslash. In situations where other pairings occur, the genres may be distinguished as m/m, f/f, &c.

Libraries
The slash is used under the Anglo-American Cataloguing Rules to separate the title of a work from its statement of responsibility (i.e., the listing of its author, director, &c.). Like a line break, this slash is surrounded by a single space on either side. For example:

 Gone with the Wind / by Margaret Mitchell.
 Star Trek II. The Wrath of Khan [videorecording] / Paramount Pictures.

The format is used in both card catalogs and online records.

Addresses
The slash is sometimes used as an abbreviation for building numbers. For example, in some contexts, 8/A Evergreen Gardens specifies Apartment 8 in Building A of the residential complex Evergreen Gardens. In the United States, however, such an address refers to the first division of Apartment 8 and is simply a variant of Apartment 8A or 8-A. Similarly in the United Kingdom, an address such as 12/2 Anywhere Road means flat (or apartment) 2 in the building numbered 12 on Anywhere Road.

Music
Slashes are used in musical notation as an alternative to writing out specific notes where it is easier to read than traditional notation or where the player can improvise. They are commonly used to indicate chords either in place of or in combination with traditional notation and for drummers as an indication to continue with the previously indicated style.

Sports
A slash is used to mark a spare (knocking down all ten pins in two throws) when scoring ten-pin and duckpin bowling.

Text messaging  
In online messaging, a slash might be used to imitate the formatting of a chat command (e.g., writing "/fliptable" as though there were such a command) or the closing tags of languages such as HTML (e.g., writing "/endrant" to end an ironic diatribe or "/s" to mark the preceding text as sarcastic). A pair of slashes is sometimes used as a way to mark italic text, where no special formatting is available (e.g., /italics/).

As a letter  
The Iraqw language of Tanzania uses the slash as a letter, representing the voiced pharyngeal fricative, as in /ameeni, "woman".

Spacing
There are usually no spaces either before or after a slash. According to New Hart's Rules: The Oxford Style Guide, a slash is usually written without spacing on either side when it connects single words, letters or symbols. Exceptions are in representing the start of a new line when quoting verse, or a new paragraph when quoting prose. The Chicago Manual of Style also allows spaces when either of the separated items is a compound that itself includes a space: "Our New Zealand / Western Australia trip". (Compare use of an en dash used to separate such compounds.) The Canadian Style: A Guide to Writing and Editing prescribes, "No space before or after an oblique when used between individual words, letters or symbols; one space before and after the oblique when used between longer groups which contain internal spacing", giving the examples "n/a" and "Language and Society / Langue et société".

According to The Chicago Manual of Style, when typesetting a URL or computer path, line breaks should occur before a slash but not in the text between two slashes.

Encoding
As a very common character, the slash (as "slant") was originally encoded in ASCII with the decimal code 47 or 0x2F. The same value was used in Unicode, which calls it "solidus" and also adds some more characters:

 
 
 
 
 
 
 
  (fullwidth version of solidus)
 

In XML and HTML, the slash can also be represented with the character entity   or the numeric character reference   or  .

Alternative names

The slash may also be read out as and, or, and/or, to, or cum in some compounds separated by a slash; over or out of in fractions, division, and numbering; and per or a(n) in derived units (as km/h) and prices (as $~/kg), where the division slash stands for "each".

See also
 Strikethrough, including slashes through figures
 Feynman slash notation in physics, which employs slash-like strikethroughs
 Inequality sign, an equals sign with a slash-like strikethrough

Notes

References

Punctuation